Baricity refers to the density of a substance compared to the density of human cerebrospinal fluid. Baricity is used in anesthesia to determine the manner in which a particular drug will spread in the intrathecal space.

Description 

Solutions that have a baricity approaching 1.000 are referred to as isobaric, as the density of the cerebrospinal fluid is approximately 1.003+/- 0.003.  Solutions with a baricity less than 0.999 are termed hypobaric, and are usually created by mixing the local anesthetic with distilled water. Hyperbaric solutions are created by mixing dextrose 5-8% with the desired local anesthetic.

Hyperbaric solutions will flow in the direction of gravity and settle in the most dependent areas of the intrathecal space. Conversely, hypobaric mixtures will rise in relation to gravitational pull. These properties allow the anesthesia provider to preferentially control the spread of the block by choice of mixture and patient positioning.

References

Anesthesia